Boribo River (Stoeng Boribo) is a river in Cambodia. It rises in the Aural mountains in Pursat and crosses Baribour District in Kampong Chhnang Province before entering the Tonlé Sap lake. It is a major tributary of the Tonlé Sap.

References

Rivers of Cambodia
Tonlé Sap